Damias elegans is a moth of the family Erebidae first described by Jean Baptiste Boisduval in 1832. It is found in Australia (Queensland), New Guinea and on Waigiou, Aru and the Trobriand Islands.

References

Damias
Moths described in 1832